Die verwandelten Weiber, oder Der Teufel ist los, erster Teil (The Metamorphosed Wives, or The Devil to Pay, Part 1) is a three-act  by the German composer Johann Adam Hiller, incorporating 14 musical numbers from the popular farce Der Teufel ist los by .

The libretto was by Christian Felix Weiße (1726–1804) based on the ballad opera The Devil to Pay, or The Wives Metamorphos'd by Charles Coffey (1731), and an opéra comique text by Michel-Jean Sedaine using the same material.

Performance history
The opera was first performed at the theatre in Quandt's Court, Leipzig on 28 May 1766, conducted by the composer.

Roles

References

Further reading
Bauman, Thomas (1992), "Verwandelten Weiber, Die" in The New Grove Dictionary of Opera, ed. Stanley Sadie (London) 

German-language operas
1766 operas
Singspiele
Operas by Johann Adam Hiller
Operas based on plays
Operas